Tyson Ka'eo Nam (born October 6, 1983) is an American professional mixed martial artist who competes in the Bantamweight division for UFC. A professional MMA competitor since 2006, Nam has formerly competed for World Series of Fighting, Elite XC, and King of the Cage.

Background
Born and raised in Waimanalo, Hawaii on the island of Oahu. Nam competed in various sports from a young age and began training in judo at the age of six before he began boxing in high school, then transitioned to kickboxing, before turning his focus to mixed martial arts. Nam attended and graduated from the University of Hawaii.

Mixed martial arts

Early career
Nam began his professional MMA career in the Hawaii-based promotion, ICON Sport. Nam compiled a 3–1 record in the promotion during 2006 and was then signed to compete in Elite XC, in which he recorded a decision victory. Nam then fought in various other promotions, such as King of the Cage, before he was signed by Bellator Fighting Championships. Nam was signed in March 2011 as a short-notice replacement in the promotion's season 6 bantamweight tournament, after the original participant, Rodrigo Lima was forced to withdraw. However, Lima was later declared able to compete and was re-entered into the tournament, forcing Nam out. Bellator then apparently promised Nam a spot in the season 7 tournament, according to Nam's trainer, Phil Claud. However, in June, Nam was informed that the competition had been cancelled and he was released from his contract

Mainstream attention
Nam then took a fight in Brazil against the Bellator Bantamweight Champion, Eduardo Dantas. Dantas had been permitted by Bellator to fight against Nam, as the fight took place outside of the United States and wouldn't be aired on television in the U.S. either. The fight was in the Shooto Brazil promotion, in an event that served as a fundraiser for the "Batalhao de Operacoes Policiais Especiais" (Special Police Operations Battalion), which was Rio de Janeiro's military special forces. Just days prior to the bout, Dantas was ranked as the seventh best bantamweight in the world by Sherdog, making this Nam's most notable opponent to date. During the fight, Nam kept the action standing. Dantas attacked with multiple knees, before attempting a flying knee. After Dantas threw one more standing knee, Nam connected with a counter right hook which knocked Dantas unconscious.

Contract controversy
After his win over Dantas, Nam began to receive attention from various other promotions. However, it was announced that Bellator still had the right to match any contract offers he received from other promotions for up to 18 months after the contract expiration. Insider sources claimed that Bellator, UFC and the newly formed "World Series of Fighting" promotion had all showed interest in signing Nam. Though Bellator had previously released Nam without him ever participating in a fight, they took out the clause to enable them to attempt to re-sign Nam. This led to controversy and criticism about their contract-matching clause, especially after Nam revealed in an interview that he wanted to join the UFC, stating "I'm hoping the next time you guys see me fight is in the UFC."

Nam was apparently offered a spot in Bellator's next Bantamweight tournament, but Nam's management advised against it, given the two failed appearances prior. Nam's trainer, Phil Claud, also commented on the situation, stating: "Bellator is basically saying that they want to sit on Tyson. They want him to go into the tournament, which would not be matching the other fight agreements. We don't want to go into the tournament. This is the third tournament that's been promised to Tyson. Basically, they were saying if you don't (sign the tournament contract), we'll give you an individual fight deal sitting on [him] for a year." Claud also hinted that Bellator would sue Nam if the clause was violated.

After the UFC had tried to sign Nam and been made aware of the contract clause, UFC president, Dana White stated: "When you made the decision to cut him, you cut him. That's one of the dirtiest things you can do in the fight business. [Tyson Nam] is not going to make or break the UFC. But the problem is, the dirty scumbag moves that these guys are pulling hurts the fighter." Bellator CEO, Bjorn Rebney, later defended his contractual clauses, saying "The essence of them is that you're not asking to restrict a fighter's ability to fight. You're not looking to hold somebody back from participating. All you're asking for is, look, if we give you an incredible opportunity to fight our champion in a non-title fight, or we give you a great opportunity to be on TV, we at least want what most promoters believe is fair – the ability just to match another offer. Not to give you less, but to give you what somebody else is offering, and they're in every single agreement we have, and I think they're probably in every single agreement the UFC has, as well."

Despite Bellator's stance on the clauses, it was announced on September 26, 2012, Bellator had declined to match the second offer made by the World Series of Fighting promotion and that Nam had officially signed with WSOF.

World Series of Fighting
After Nam signed with the World Series of Fighting promotion, it was announced that his debut fight would be against the winner of the Miguel Torres vs. Marlon Moraes fight at WSOF 1 in November. Following Moraes' victory, Moraes and Nam met at World Series of Fighting 2 on March 23, 2013.  Nam lost the fight via knockout in the first round.

Ultimate Fighting Championship
After more than a decade as a professional mixed martial artist, Nam signed with the Ultimate Fighting Championship on short notice to replace injured Alex Perez against Sergio Pettis on September 21, 2019, at UFC on ESPN+ 17. He lost the fight by unanimous decision.

Nam faced Kai Kara-France on February 23, 2020, at UFC Fight Night 168. He lost the fight via unanimous decision.

Nam was expected to face Ryan Benoit on June 13, 2020, at UFC on ESPN: Eye vs. Calvillo. However, on June 9, 2020, Benoit withdrew from the bout for unknown reason and he was replaced by promotional newcomer Zarrukh Adashev. At the weigh-ins on June 12, Adashev missed weight, weighing in at 138.5 pounds, 2.5 over the non-title bantamweight limit of 136 pounds. The bout proceeded at a catchweight and Adashev was fined 20% of his purse. Nam won the bout via knockout just 32 seconds into the first round. This win earned him the Performance of the Night award.

Nam was expected to face Matt Schnell on September 12, 2020, at UFC Fight Night 177. However, Schnell was removed from the fight on the day of the event's weigh-in for health issues related to his weight cut. As a result, the fight was cancelled.

Nam faced Jerome Rivera on September 19, 2020, at UFC Fight Night 178. He won the fight via technical knockout early into the second round.

The bout with Schell was rescheduled and was expected to take place on December 19, 2020, at UFC Fight Night 183. In turn, the contest eventually took place on January 20, 2021, at UFC on ESPN 20. Nam lost the bout by split decision.

Nam was scheduled to face Tagir Ulanbekov on June 19, 2021, at UFC on ESPN 25. However, the bout was never officially announced by the promotion and the matchup will not take place on the card due to a recent undisclosed illness for Ulanbekov.

The pair was rescheduled to meet on June 25, 2022, at UFC on ESPN 38 but Ulanbekov pulled out due to undisclosed injury.

Nam faced Ode' Osbourne on August 13, 2022, at UFC on ESPN 41. He won the fight via knockout in round one. This win earned him a Performance of the Night award.

Nam faced Bruno Gustavo da Silva on March 11, 2023, at UFC Fight Night 221. He lost the fight via technical submission due to a rear-naked choke in round two.

Championships and accomplishments

Mixed martial arts
Ultimate Fighting Championship
Performance of the Night (Two times)

Personal life
Nam's older brother, Jason, a professional bodybuilder, was shot and killed outside of his apartment on March 10, 2006. The elder Nam brother was also engaged to his fiancé at the time.

Mixed martial arts record

|-
|Loss
|align=center|21–13–1
|Bruno Gustavo da Silva
|Technical Submission (rear-naked choke)
|UFC Fight Night: Yan vs. Dvalishvili
|
|align=center|2
|align=center|1:23
|Las Vegas, Nevada, United States
|
|-
|Win
|align=center|21–12–1
|Ode' Osbourne
|KO (punches)
|UFC on ESPN: Vera vs. Cruz
|
|align=center|1
|align=center|2:59
|San Diego, California, United States
||
|-
|Loss
|align=center|20–12–1
|Matt Schnell
|Decision (split)
|UFC on ESPN: Chiesa vs. Magny
|
|align=center|3
|align=center|5:00
|Abu Dhabi, United Arab Emirates
|
|-
|Win
|align=center|20–11–1
|Jerome Rivera
|TKO (punches)
|UFC Fight Night: Covington vs. Woodley
|
|align=center|2
|align=center|0:34
|Las Vegas, Nevada, United States
|
|-
|Win
|align=center|19–11–1
|Zarrukh Adashev
|KO (punch)
|UFC on ESPN: Eye vs. Calvillo
|
|align=center|1
|align=center|0:32
|Las Vegas, Nevada, United States
|
|-
|Loss
|align=center|18–11–1
|Kai Kara-France
|Decision (unanimous)
|UFC Fight Night: Felder vs. Hooker 
|
|align=center|3
|align=center|5:00
|Auckland, New Zealand
|
|-
|Loss
|align=center|
|Sergio Pettis
|Decision (unanimous)
|UFC Fight Night: Rodríguez vs. Stephens 
|
|align=center|3
|align=center|5:00
|Mexico City, Mexico
|
|-
|Win
|align=center|18–9–1
|Shojin Miki 
|Decision (unanimous)
|X-1 World Events 55: MMA Independence Day 
|
|align=center|5
|align=center|5:00
|Waipahu, Hawaii, United States
|
|-
|Win
|align=center|17–9–1
|Donald Gonzalez
|TKO (punches)
|X-1 World Events 54: Champions 4
|
|align=center|2
|align=center|1:03
|Honolulu, Hawaii, United States
|
|-
|Loss
|align=center|16–9–1
|Zhalgas Zhumagulov
|Decision (unanimous)
|Fight Nights Global 86: Nam vs. Zhumagulov
|
|align=center|5
|align=center|5:00
|Almaty, Kazakhstan
|
|-
|Win
|align=center|16–8–1
|Rizvan Abuev
|KO (punch)
|Fight Nights Global 75: Deák vs. Chistyakov
|
|align=center|1
|align=center|4:45
|Saint Petersburg, Russia
|
|-
|Win
|align=center|15–8–1
|Ali Bagautinov
|KO (head kick)
|Fight Nights Global 64: Nam vs. Bagautinov
|
|align=center|3
|align=center|4:59
|Moscow, Russia
|
|-
|Draw
|align=center|14–8–1
|Yoni Sherbatov
|Draw (majority)
|Destiny MMA: Trinity
|
|align=center|3
|align=center|5:00
|Edmonton, Alberta, Canada
|
|-
|Win
|align=center|14–8
|Ian Dela Cuesta
|Decision (split)
|Destiny MMA: Trinity
|
|align=center|3
|align=center|5:00
|Kapolei, Hawaii, United States
|
|-
|Win
|align=center|13–8
|Arnold Berdon
|KO (punches) 
|Destiny MMA: Na Koa 10
|
|align=center|1
|align=center|N/A
|Honolulu, Hawaii, United States
|
|-
|Loss
|align=center|12–8
|Fernando Vieira
|Decision (unanimous)
|XFC International 8
|
|align=center|3
|align=center|5:00
|São Paulo, Brazil
|
|-
|Loss
|align=center|12–7
|Jeremiah Labiano
|Decision (unanimous)
|WCFC 11: Mitchell vs. Major
|
|align=center|5
|align=center|5:00
|Sacramento, California, United States
|
|-
|Loss
|align=center|12–6
|Cody Bollinger
|Decision (unanimous)
|WSOF 8
|
|align=center|3
|align=center|5:00
|Hollywood, Florida, United States
|
|-
|Loss
|align=center|12–5
|Marlon Moraes
|KO (head kick and punches)
|WSOF 2
|
|align=center|1
|align=center|2:55
|Atlantic City, New Jersey United States
|
|-
|Win
|align=center|12–4
|Eduardo Dantas
|KO (punch)
|Shooto Brazil 33
|
|align=center|1
|align=center|1:36
|Rio de Janeiro, Brazil
|
|-
|Win
|align=center|11–4
|Chanti Johnson
|Decision (unanimous)
|CageSport 16
|
|align=center|3
|align=center|5:00
|Tacoma, Washington, United States
|
|-
|Win
|align=center|10–4
|Chuck Jordan
|TKO (punches)
|Sportfight: Brawl at the Barn
|
|align=center|1
|align=center|0:52
|Prineville, Oregon, United States
|
|-
|Win
|align=center|9–4
|Chanti Johnson
|TKO (punches)
|Square Ring Promotions
|
|align=center|1
|align=center|0:45
|Grand Ronde, Oregon, United States
|
|-
|Loss
|align=center|8–4
|Jesse Brock
|Decision (unanimous)
|Sportfight 29: All In
|
|align=center|5
|align=center|5:00
|Grand Ronde, Oregon, United States
|
|-
|Loss
|align=center|8–3
|Keola Silva
|Decision (majority)
|Galaxy MMA: Worlds Collide
|
|align=center|3
|align=center|5:00
|Honolulu, Hawaii, United States
|
|-
|Win
|align=center|8–2
|Nick Honstein
|TKO (punches)
|Sportfight 27: Wild Card
|
|align=center|2
|align=center|3:31
|Grand Ronde, Oregon, United States
|
|-
|Win
|align=center|7–2
|Zach Lari
|Decision (unanimous)
|Arena Rumble: Horn vs. Guida
|
|align=center|3
|align=center|5:00
|Spokane, Washington, United States
|
|-
|Win
|align=center|6–2
|Zach Skinner
|KO (punches)
|KOTC: Thunderstruck
|
|align=center|1
|align=center|4:58
|Everett, Washington, United States
|
|-
|Win
|align=center|5–2
|Butch McGavran
|Submission (rear-naked choke)
|Carnage at the Creek 6
|
|align=center|1
|align=center|3:26
|Shelton, Washington, United States
|
|-
|Loss
|align=center|4–2
|Russell Doane
|TKO (punches)
|ICON Sport: Baroni vs. Hose
|
|align=center|1
|align=center|2:33
|Honolulu, Hawaii, United States
|
|-
|Win
|align=center|4–1
|Albert Manners
|Decision (unanimous)
|EliteXC: Uprising
|
|align=center|3
|align=center|5:00
|Honolulu, Hawaii, United States
|
|-
|Loss
|align=center|3–1
|Mark Oshiro
|TKO (punches)
|ICON Sport: Mayhem vs. Trigg
|
|align=center|1
|align=center|2:16
|Honolulu, Hawaii, United States
|
|-
|Win
|align=center|3–0
|Ikaika Silva
|Decision (unanimous)
|ICON Sport: Mayhem vs. Lawler
|
|align=center|3
|align=center|5:00
|Honolulu, Hawaii, United States
|
|-
|Win
|align=center|2–0
|Bill Dexter
|Decision (unanimous)
|ICON Sport: Mayhem vs. Giant
|
|align=center|3
|align=center|3:00
|Honolulu, Hawaii, United States
|
|-
|Win
|align=center|1–0
|Ryan Lee
|TKO (punches)
|ICON Sport: Lawler vs. Niko 2
|
|align=center|3
|align=center|1:01
|Honolulu, Hawaii, United States
|
|}

References

External links
Tyson Name Bio on WSOF.com

1983 births
Living people
American male mixed martial artists
Bantamweight mixed martial artists
Flyweight mixed martial artists
Mixed martial artists utilizing kickboxing
Mixed martial artists from Hawaii
Ultimate Fighting Championship male fighters
Sportspeople from Portland, Oregon
American sportspeople of Korean descent
People from Honolulu County, Hawaii